Daniel Rogers (born 23 March 1994) is a professional footballer who plays as a goalkeeper for St Patrick's Athletic. Born in the United States, he has represented the Republic of Ireland at youth level.

Personal life
Rogers was born in New York and has an Irish mother and an American father. He holds an American passport. The family, including Rogers and his two brothers, moved back to Ireland when he was five years old. Before signing with Aberdeen, he was close to going on a scholarship to the United States.

Club career

Aberdeen
Rogers signed his first professional contract with Aberdeen in July 2011 and played regularly for the club's youth sides. In December 2013, he joined Airdrieonians on loan for a month but returned to the Dons at the end of this short spell.

On 1 August 2014, he signed for Dumbarton on a six-month loan deal after impressing in friendly matches as a trialist. He made his debut in a 1–0 victory over Brechin City and was named the club's Player of the Month for September 2014. His loan deal was extended on 2 January 2015, until the end of the 2014–15 season. At the end of the season, he scooped the 'Dumbarton Terrace' and Baxter Ramsay (club sponsor) Player of the Year awards as well as the prestigious Sonstrust Young Player of the Season accolade. He returned to parent club Aberdeen having made 36 appearances in total for Ian Murray's side, keeping nine clean sheets.

On 26 June 2015, Rogers moved to Falkirk on a loan deal for the whole of the 2015–16 season. During his loan spell, he was announced as part of the PFA Scotland Championship Team of the Season. In July 2016, Rogers returned to the Falkirk Stadium for a second season-long loan spell.

Rogers made his debut for Aberdeen on 24 January 2018, coming on as a substitute for the injured Joe Lewis in a 2–0 defeat away to Rangers. At the end of the 2017–18 season, Rogers signed a two-year contract with Aberdeen.

In July 2018, Rogers moved to St Mirren on a season-long loan deal.

In August 2019, Rogers moved to Greenock Morton on a season-long loan deal.

On 10 June 2020, Rogers announced his departure from Aberdeen via his Twitter account.

Kilmarnock
On 28 July 2020, Rogers signed a one-year deal with Kilmarnock. He made his debut on 1 August 2020, against Hibernian, as a half-time substitute for the injured Jake Eastwood. He left Kilmarnock at the end of the 2020–21 season.

Oldham Athletic
In August 2021 Rogers signed to Oldham Athletic. His debut was the first game of the season in EFL League Two at home against Newport County. Rogers failed to stop the only goal of the game allowing Newport to win 1–0. Rogers was released at the end of the 2021–22 season following relegation.

St Patrick's Athletic
Rogers returned home to Dublin to sign for League of Ireland Premier Division club St Patrick's Athletic on 14 August 2022, replacing the outbound Joseph Anang. He made his debut for the club on the same day, keeping a clean sheet in a 1–0 win over Sligo Rovers. Rogers made 10 appearances by the end of the season as his side came 4th and qualified for the UEFA Europa Conference League for the following season. On 13 December 2022, Rogers signed a new contract with the club for the 2023 season. On 24 February 2023, in the pre-match warmup ahead of a home fixture against Shelbourne, Rogers suffered a dislocated, compound fracture, with the bone came out of the skin also, an injury that would keep him out of action for a minimum of 3 months.

International career
Rogers' performances on loan at Dumbarton earned him a call-up to the Republic of Ireland U21 squad for the game against Norway U21s in October 2014. He made his debut as a 60th-minute substitute and did not concede in his time on the pitch. The game finished 4–1 to Norway. He made his first start for the team in a 1–0 defeat to United States U21s.

Rogers received his first call-up to the senior Republic of Ireland side for the 2018 FIFA World Cup qualifiers against Georgia and Moldova in October 2016.

Career statistics

References

External links

1994 births
Living people
Republic of Ireland association footballers
Republic of Ireland under-21 international footballers
American soccer players
Irish people of American descent
American people of Irish descent
Association football goalkeepers
Belvedere F.C. players
Cherry Orchard F.C. players
Aberdeen F.C. players
Airdrieonians F.C. players
Dumbarton F.C. players
Falkirk F.C. players
St Mirren F.C. players
Greenock Morton F.C. players
Kilmarnock F.C. players
Oldham Athletic A.F.C. players
St Patrick's Athletic F.C. players
Scottish Professional Football League players
English Football League players
League of Ireland players